is a town located in Sorachi Subprefecture, Hokkaido, Japan.

As of September 2016, the town has an estimated population of 1,965, and a density of 12 persons per km2. The total area is 158.82 km2.

It is home to the Hokuryu Sunflower Village, the largest sunflower fields in Japan, where more than a million sunflowers bloom between July & August.

Culture

Mascot

She is a sunflower who attends Hokuryū's various events and promotes products and tourism of the town. She was unveiled in March 1991.

References

External links
Official Website 

Towns in Hokkaido